Dellon Peiris (born 16 March 2000) is a Sri Lankan cricketer. He made his Twenty20 debut on 9 March 2021, for Ragama Cricket Club in the 2020–21 SLC Twenty20 Tournament. He made his List A debut on 30 March 2021, for Ragama Cricket Club in the 2020–21 Major Clubs Limited Over Tournament.

References

External links
 

2000 births
Living people
Sri Lankan cricketers
Ragama Cricket Club cricketers
Place of birth missing (living people)